This is a list of notable individuals and organizations who voiced their endorsement for the office of the Czech president, including those who subsequently retracted or withheld their endorsement of any candidate during the 2023 Czech presidential election.

Andrej Babiš

Political

First round
Václav Klaus, former Prime Minister and former President of the Czech Republic (2003-2013) stated that Babiš is the only candidate whom can people thoughtfully vote for.
Vojtěch Filip, former leader of the Communist Party of Bohemia and Moravia
Miloš Zeman, the incumbent President (2013-Since).
Parties
ANO 2011
Domov

Second round
Jan Sedláček, deputy leader of National Democracy and leader of National Youth
Petr Hannig, leader of Party of Common Sense
Parties
Alliance of National Forces
Communist Party of Bohemia and Moravia
Law, Respect, Expertise
Tricolour Citizens' Movement

Non-political
Gabriela Chocholoušová Petirová, opera singer.
Agáta Hanychová, model.
David Pet, musician.
Petr Robejšek, political scientist and former politician.
Laky Royal, barber.
Roman Skamene, actor.
Josef Váňa, steeplechase jockey.

Jaroslav Bašta

Political
Adam B. Bartoš, leader of National Democracy
Ladislav Jakl
Vojtěch Filip, former leader of the Communist Party of Bohemia and Moravia
Josef Skála, political scientist and planned candidate for the Communist Party of Bohemia and Moravia.
Tomáš Vandas, leader of Workers' Party of Social Justice
Parties
Freedom and Direct Democracy
Alliance of National Forces
Akce D.O.S.T.
Czech National Social Party
Hnutí PES
Manifest.cz
Tricolour Citizens' Movement
Zachraňme náš stát

Non-political
Petr Hájek, journalist.
 Václav Hrabák, publicist.
Otto Jarolímek, businessman.
Zdeněk Koudelka, constitutional lawyer.
Pepa Nos, songwriter.
Monika Pilloni, publicist.

Karel Diviš

Non-political
Jiří Babica, chef.

Pavel Fischer

Political
Marek Benda, MP.
Hayato Okamura, Senator.
Pavel Novotný, Mayor of Praha-Řeporyje.
Miloš Vystrčil, President of the Senate.
Karel Schwarzenberg, former Minister of Foreign Affairs and candidate in 2013 election.

Parties
Civic Democratic Party
KDU-ČSL
TOP 09
Club of Committed Non-Party Members
SNK European Democrats

Non-political
Lukáš Langmajer, actor.
Josef Polášek, actor.

Marek Hilšer

Political
Jiří Drahoš, Senator and 2018 presidential candidate initially endorsed Hilšer's candidacy.
Klára Long Slámová, withdrawn candidate.
David Smoljak, Senator.
Adéla Šípová, Senator.
Parties
Club of Committed Non-Party Members

Non-political
Gabriela Svárovská, member of Association for International Questions.
Martin Vadas, documentarist.
Michaela Weissová, director of Home for Trees.

Danuše Nerudová

Political
Jan Grolich, South Moravian governor.
Daniel Herman, former Minister of Culture.
Miroslav Kalousek, former Minister of Finance.
Josef Středula, withdrawn candidate

Parties
Civic Democratic Party
KDU-ČSL
TOP 09
Club of Committed Non-Party Members
SNK European Democrats

Non-political
Sergei Barracuda, rapper.
Anna Geislerová, actress.
Ladislav Gerendáš, actor.
Lukáš Hejlík, blogger.
Petra Jirglová, blogger.
Jan Musil, moderator.
Tomáš Sedláček, economist.
Anatol Svahilec, slam poet.
Nikol Štíbrová, actress.
Veronika Žilková, actress.

Petr Pavel

Political

First round
Jiří Drahoš, Senator and 2018 presidential candidate eventually endorsed Pavel in January 2023.
Petr Kolář, diplomat.
Tomáš Macura, mayor of Ostrava
Olga Sommerová, documetary film director and former MP.
Ivo Vondrák, deputy leader of ANO 2011
Vladimír Votápek, diplomat and analyst.
Parties
Civic Democratic Party
KDU-ČSL
TOP 09
SNK European Democrats

Second round
Petr Fiala, incumbent Prime Minister
Markéta Pekarová Adamová, incumbent President of the Chamber of Deputies
Vít Rakušan, incumbent First Deputy Prime Minister and Minister of the Interior
Marian Jurečka, incumbent Deputy Prime Minister and Minister of Labour and Social Affairs
Michal Horáček, candidate in 2018
Miroslav Kalousek, former Minister of Finance
Mirek Topolánek, former Prime Minister
Jiří Rusnok, former Prime Minister
Danuše Nerudová
Pavel Fischer
Marek Hilšer
Karel Diviš
Parties
Czech Social Democratic Party
Green Party
Hlas
Mayors and Independents
Mayors for the Liberec Region
Volt Czech Republic

Non-political
Zlata Adamovská, actress.
Tomáš Halík, Priest and University professor.
Radek Banga, singer.
Petr Čtvrtníček, actor and comedian.
Jitka Čvančarová, actress.
Martin Dejdar, actor.
Kristýna Frejová, actress.
Eva Holubová, actress.
Vavřinec Hradilek slalom canoeist.
Jan Hřebejk, film director.
Jaroslav Hutka, musician, composer, songwriter, and democracy and human rights activist.
Daniela Kolářová, actress.
Taťána Kuchařová, dancer, model and beauty queen who won the title of Miss World 2006.
Janek Ledecký, singer.
Václav Marhoul, film director.
Ondřej Pavelka, actor.
Dagmar Pecková, operatic mezzo-soprano.
Tomáš Plekanec, ice hockey player.
Vladimír Polívka, actor.
Liběna Rochová, fashion designer.
Eduard Stehlík, historian and writer.
Zdeněk Svěrák actor, humorist, playwright and scriptwriter.
Lucie Šafářová, tennis player.
Milan Šteindler, actor.
Dominik Hašek, former ice hockey player.
Jiří Procházka, mixed martial artist.
Lukáš Vácha, footballer.
Michal Šlesingr, former biathlete.
Eva Puskarčíková, former biathlete.
Jessica Jislová, biathlete.

Josef Středula (withdrawn)

Political
Vojtěch Filip, former leader of the Communist Party of Bohemia and Moravia
Parties
Czech Social Democratic Party

Non-political
Tomáš Enge, car racer.
Pavel Šaradín, political scientist.

Tomáš Zima

Political
Vojtěch Filip, former leader of the Communist Party of Bohemia and Moravia

Non-political
Jiří Malúš, businessman.

References

Political endorsements in the Czech Republic
2023 Czech presidential election